Yaghistan (The Land of Rebels) was a key frontier region between Afghanistan and British India. This was an area where Pashtun tribes lived, on either side of the Durand Line.

History
Yāghistān was the center of Mahmud Hasan Deobandi's Silk Letter Movement. The area was never conquered by the British Raj and its people and the unadministered tribes always remained hostile towards the British.

According to the Encyclopaedia of Islam, Yaghistan "referred to different sanctuaries used by Mujahideen against the British authorities in the 19th and early 20th centuries, in the various independent tribal areas, mainly inhabited by the Pak̲h̲tūns [Pashtuns], in the hinterland of what became the North-West Frontier Province (NWFP) of British India such as the Mohmand Agency, Bunēr, Dīr, Swāt, Kohistān, Hazāra and Čamarkand."

Notable people
 Akbar Yaghistani, a student and companion of Mahmud Hasan Deobandi who participated in the Silk Letter Movement

References

Further reading
 
 

Geography of Afghanistan
British India
Regions of Afghanistan